José Luís Mendes Andrade (born 24 January 1991), known as Zé Luís, is a Cape Verdean professional footballer who plays as a striker for Süper Lig club Hatayspor.

He spent most of his career in Portugal, playing 68 Primeira Liga games and scoring 23 goals for Gil Vicente, Braga and Porto, winning a league title with the last of those teams in 2020. He also competed in the Russian Premier League with Spartak Moscow and Lokomotiv Moscow, picking up a winners' medal with the former in 2017.

Club career

Gil Vicente and Braga
Born in Fogo, Zé Luís began his professional career at the age 18 with his last youth club, Gil Vicente FC. In his first season he played only five Segunda Liga games – his debut coming on 29 November 2009 in a 0–3 home loss against G.D. Chaves – but managed to score four goals.

In 2010–11, under new manager Paulo Alves, Zé Luís netted ten times for the Barcelos side as they achieved promotion to the Primeira Liga after a five-year absence, as champions. On 2 June 2011, he signed for S.C. Braga on a five-year contract.

Zé Luís served two loan spells during his tenure in Minho, spending three months with former club Gil and one full season with Videoton FC in Hungary; he also featured regularly for Braga B in the second tier. In between, he played for the main squad in the 2013 Taça da Liga Final, as a substitute in a 1–0 win over FC Porto at the Estádio Cidade de Coimbra. On 7 April 2015, he scored his first career hat-trick, helping defeat Rio Ave F.C. 3–0 at home in the semi-finals of the Taça de Portugal (4–1 on aggregate). He battled for position with Eder during the campaign, finishing with 11 goals in all competitions.

Spartak Moscow

On 7 July 2015, Zé Luís joined Russian Premier League club FC Spartak Moscow. He scored five times in the 2016–17 season, as his team won the domestic championship for the 22nd time in history.

In July 2017, Zé Luís extended his link to Spartak until 2021. In the same month, he won the Super Cup in a 2–1 victory over city rivals FC Lokomotiv Moscow. During the 2018–19 campaign, he contributed ten league goals – 14 in all competitions – to a fifth-place finish.

Porto
On 2 July 2019, Spartak announced that the transfer of Zé Luís to Porto had been agreed on, and a four-year contract was signed three days later. He scored three times in only his second league appearance, a 4–0 home rout of Vitória de Setúbal.

Zé Luís scored seven league goals in his only season at the Estádio do Dragão for the eventual champions, and ten overall as the team secured the double.

Later career
On 6 October 2020, Zé Luís returned to the Russian capital, when he joined Lokomotiv Moscow on a three-year deal for a €5 million fee. On 13 January 2022, his contract was terminated by mutual consent.

Zé Luís signed a six-month deal with Al Taawoun FC of the Saudi Professional League on 8 February 2022. He played nine games for the club and scored once on 14 April, in the first minute of the second half of a 3–0 home win over Sepahan S.C. in the AFC Champions League group stage.

On 7 September 2022, Zé Luís signed a one-season contract with Hatayspor in Turkey. His first Süper Lig goal came on 24 October, equalising a 2–1 home victory against Beşiktaş JK. The Antakya-based side withdrew from the season in February after an earthquake.

International career
Zé Luís made his debut for Cape Verde on 24 May 2010, playing one minute in a friendly in Covilhã with Portugal, who were preparing for the FIFA World Cup in South Africa. He was selected by manager Lúcio Antunes for the squad that appeared at the 2013 Africa Cup of Nations, but withdrew for personal reasons.

Zé Luís scored his first goal for the national team on 6 September 2014, in a 3–1 away win against Niger for the 2015 Africa Cup of Nations qualifiers. His second came in the 2–1 home victory over Zambia for the same competition four days later, as the Blue Sharks eventually reached the finals in Equatorial Guinea. However, he was not picked for the tournament.

On 10 October 2019, Zé Luís scored the equaliser as Cape Verde came from behind to win 2–1 against Togo in an exhibition game in Fos-sur-Mer, France. It was his first appearance for over two years, and his first goal in more than five.

Career statistics

Club

Notes

International

 (Cape Verde score listed first, score column indicates score after each Zé Luís goal)

Honours

Gil Vicente
Segunda Liga: 2010–11

Braga
Taça da Liga: 2012–13

Spartak Moscow
Russian Premier League: 2016–17
Russian Super Cup: 2017

Porto
Primeira Liga: 2019–20
Taça de Portugal: 2019–20

Cape Verde
Lusofonia Games: 2009

Individual
Russian Premier League Player of the Month: October 2016
Russian Premier League Top 33 Players of the Season: 2016–17 (right forward Nº2), 2018–19 (left forward Nº3)
Primeira Liga Forward of the Month: August 2019

References

External links

1991 births
Living people
People from Fogo, Cape Verde
Cape Verdean footballers
Association football forwards
Primeira Liga players
Liga Portugal 2 players
Gil Vicente F.C. players
S.C. Braga B players
S.C. Braga players
FC Porto players
Nemzeti Bajnokság I players
Fehérvár FC players
Russian Premier League players
FC Spartak Moscow players
FC Lokomotiv Moscow players
Saudi Professional League players
Al-Taawoun FC players
Süper Lig players
Hatayspor footballers
Cape Verde international footballers
Cape Verdean expatriate footballers
Expatriate footballers in Portugal
Expatriate footballers in Hungary
Expatriate footballers in Russia
Expatriate footballers in Saudi Arabia
Expatriate footballers in Turkey
Cape Verdean expatriate sportspeople in Portugal
Cape Verdean expatriate sportspeople in Hungary
Cape Verdean expatriate sportspeople in Russia
Cape Verdean expatriate sportspeople in Saudi Arabia
Cape Verdean expatriate sportspeople in Turkey